Salil Dutta (30 November 1931 – 20 September 2004) was an Indian Bengali director, screenwriter and actor. He is well known for his films Surya Sikha (1963), Stree (1972) and Seyi Chokh (1976).

Career
Dutta was born in 1931 in British India. He started his career as assistant director of Trijama in 1956 and Khokababur Pratyabartan in 1960. The first film directed by him is Surya Sikha (1963) starred  Uttam Kumar and Supriya Choudhury. He also acted in a number of films like Atithi (1965 film), Khelaghar, Dhanyee Meye etc. Dutta directed 22 Bengali films in his career. He died on 20 September 2004 in Kolkata due to lung cancer.

Filmography
 Surya Sikha (1963)
 Momer Alo (1964)
 Prastar Swakkhor (1967)
 Aparichita (1969)
 Kalankita Nayak (1970)
 Khunje Berai (1971)
 Stree (1972)
 Sesh Pristhay Dekhun (1973)
 Asati (1974)
 Sei Chokh (1976)
 Babu Moshai (1977)
 Heerey Manik (1979)
 Ghorer Baire Ghor (1980)
 Ogo Bodhu Sundori (1981)
 Rajeswari (1984)
 Shyam Saheb (1986)
 Urvashi (1986)
 Doctor Priya (1988)
 Je Jaar Priyo (1989)
 Abishkar (1990
 Amar Sathi (1991)
  Etai Swargo(2001)

References

External links
 

1932 births
2004 deaths
Bengali Hindus
Bengali film directors
20th-century Indian film directors
Film directors from Kolkata
Indian male screenwriters
20th-century Indian screenwriters
20th-century Indian male writers